This list of 2009 motorsport champions is a list of national or international auto racing series with a Championship decided by the points or positions earned by a driver from multiple races.

Open wheel racing

Karting

Sports car

Touring car racing

Stock car racing

Rallying

Rally raid

Rallycross

Drifting

Truck racing

Motorcycles

Road racing

Motocross

Supercross

Freestyle Motocross

Supermoto

Arenacross

Motorcycle speedway

Ice speedway

Water surface racing

Offshore powerboat racing

Hydroplane racing

Outboard powerboat racing

Air racing

See also
 List of motorsport championships

 Champions
2009